Tiszabő is a village in Jász-Nagykun-Szolnok county, in the Northern Great Plain region of central Hungary. It has the highest density of blood plasma donors in Hungary (6.2% of population).

Geography

References

External links
 Official site in Hungarian

Populated places in Jász-Nagykun-Szolnok County